Ernst Knoll (23 January 1940 – 19 January 1997) was a German wrestler who competed in the 1968 Summer Olympics and in the 1972 Summer Olympics.

References

External links
 

1940 births
1997 deaths
Olympic wrestlers of West Germany
Wrestlers at the 1968 Summer Olympics
Wrestlers at the 1972 Summer Olympics
German male sport wrestlers